Duospina is  a genus of moths, belonging to the family Batrachedridae. It was formerly included in the Coleophoridae.

Species
Duospina abolitor Hodges, 1966
Duospina trichella (Busck, 1908)

References

Batrachedridae